Finkoella is a genus of sack-like body fossils of an Ediacaran tunicate-like organism that was first described from a spot in Ukraine in 2021. In the same paper that described the genus Finkoella, another organism was described named Pharyngomorpha, being a reticulate, possibly being a fragment of the Pharyngeal basket of a Finkoella. The genus contains two species, F. ukrainica and F. oblonga, with the former of which being the type species of this genus, with its name referring to where it was described from, Ukraine.

It is also worth noting the similarities of Finkoella ukrainica to fossilised clay pebbles, that are also seen within the Cambrian, that also showed up with the holotype of F. ukrainica.

Description

F. ukrainica
F. ukrainica seems to be represented by oval- elliptical-shaped fossils, that rarely ever become the same shape as F. oblonga, which are thought to show a short, protruding neck-like structure and/or a shallow sinus. Often, a low or shallow circular protrusion/depression can be spotted in the convex or concave structure of the fossil. Smaller specimens of this species can be present without the protruding neck as well as the other multiple protrusions/depressions within the fossils.

The holotype for F. ukrainica is described as a convex oval-shaped form on the lower surface of a micaceous clayey, with very finely-grained sandstone making up its slab. One of the aforementioned ends being more elongated, with the other end being more rounded in nature. The latter of the ends shows  a short, protruding neck that becomes wider when reaching its termination. With the termination that ends the neck being rather unevenly lobate, with the terminations margins being sharp and even in appearance. The structures surface is generally smooth, except for the local grain-sized corrugations, the thin and short grooves and a longer, narrower groove that runs obliquely throughout three-quarters of the width that is closer to the wider end of the holotype's body.

F. oblonga

F. oblonga represents itself as a more elongated Finkoella that shows winding margins across its body, alongside longitudinal furrows/ridges which tend to run parallel to the fossil's margin. And as a result of that, tend to form concentric rings around the terminations. These concentric rings are more continuous on one side than the opposite side, where on the latter only fragments of them are visible instead of the full ring. This structure also shows a multitude of small corrugations, although these corrugations do not form any pattern whatsoever.

Etymology
The generic epithet, Finkoella, honours the amateur palaeontologist S.V. Finko who helped provide the holotype for F. ukrainica, as well as the sandstone slab that had the paratype of F. oblonga fossilised onto it. The specific epithet, ukrainica, refers to Ukraine, the country where both species are found. The specific epithet oblonga, feminine form of the Latin word oblongus meaning "elongate," refers to the elongated appearance of the second species, F. oblonga.

See also
 List of Ediacaran genera
 Burykhia
 Yarnemia

References

Ediacaran
Ediacaran life
Fossils of Ukraine
Prehistoric animal genera
Fossil taxa described in 2021
Enigmatic prehistoric animal genera
Chordates